Ionic conductivity (denoted by ) is a measure of a substance's tendency towards ionic conduction. Ionic conduction is the movement of ions.  The phenomenon is observed in solids and solutions. Ionic conduction is one mechanism of current.

In crystalline solids
In most solids, ions rigidly occupy fixed positions, strongly embraced by neighboring atoms or ions.  In some solids, selected ions are highly mobile allowing ionic conduction. The mobility increases with temperature.  Materials exhibiting this property are used in batteries. A well-known ion conductive solid is β''-alumina ("BASE"), a form of aluminium oxide that has channels through which sodium cations can hop. When this ceramic is complexed with a mobile ion, such as Na+, it behaves as so-called fast ion conductor.  BASE is used as a membrane in several types of molten salt electrochemical cell.

In glasses
Ion conduction in disordered solids like glasses, polymers, nanocomposites, defective crystals and other disordered solids plays an important role in technology.

History
Ionic conduction in solids has been a subject of interest since the beginning of the 19th century. Michael Faraday established in 1839 that the laws of electrolysis are also obeyed in ionic solids like lead(II) fluoride and silver sulfide. In 1921, solid silver iodide was found to have had extraordinary high ionic conductivity at temperatures above 147 °C, AgI changes into a phase that has an ionic conductivity of ~ 1 –1 cm−1. This high temperature phase of AgI is an example of a superionic conductor. The disordered structure of this solid allows the Ag+ ions to move easily. The present record holder for ionic conductivity is the related material Ag2HgI4. β''-alumina was developed at the Ford Motor Company in the search for a storage device for electric vehicles while developing the sodium–sulfur battery.

See also
 Lattice energy
 Fast ion conductor
 NASICON

References

External links
 J Chem Phys

Physical quantities
Electrochemistry